This is a list of Nigerian films scheduled for release in 2021.

2021

January–March

April–June

July–September 

{| class="wikitable"
! colspan="2" |Opening
! style="width:20%;" |Title
! style="width:10%;" |Director
!Cast
! style="width:13%" |Genre
! style="width:20%" |Notes
!Ref.
|-
| rowspan="2" style="text-align:center; background:orange; textcolor:#000;" |JULY
|style="text-align:center; background:#d8d8d8; textcolor:#000;" |2
|Devil In Agbada
||Umanu Elijah

|Erica Nlewedim

Linda Osifo

Efe Irele
|Action
|
|
|-
| style="text-align:center; background:#d8d8d8; textcolor:#000;" |9
|Gone
|Daniel Ademinokan
|Sam Dede
Gabriel Afolayan

Stella Damasus

Ada Ameh

Bimbo Manuel
|
|
|
|-
| style="text-align:center; background:green; textcolor:#000;" |AUGUST
| rowspan="1" style="text-align:center; background:#d8d8d8; textcolor:#000;" |20
|Loving Rona
|Luke Aire Oyovbaire
|Meg Otanwa 
Gideon Okeke

Jeffbankz Nweke
|Romance
|
|
|-
| rowspan="2" style="text-align:center; background:orange; textcolor:#000;" |SEPT
E

M

B

ER
| rowspan="2" style="text-align:center; background:#d8d8d8; textcolor:#000;" |10
|The Ghost and the Tout Too
|Michael 'Ama Psalmist' Akinrogunde
|Mercy Johnson-Okojie
Patience Ozokwo

Iyabo Ojo

Odunlade Adekola
|Dramatic comedy
|
|
|-
|Love Castle
|Desmond Eliott
|Kehinde Bankole
Jide Kosoko

Zack Orji

Desmond Elliot

Femi Adebayo Salami
|
|
|
|}

October–December 
{| class="wikitable"
! colspan="2" |Opening
! style="width:20%;" |Title
! style="width:10%;" |Director
!Cast
! style="width:13%" |Genre
! style="width:20%" |Notes
!Ref.
|-
| rowspan="2" style="text-align:center; background:orange; textcolor:#000;" |OCTOBER
|rowspan="1" style="text-align:center; background:#d8d8d8; textcolor:#000;"|15
|Charge and Bail
|Uyoyou Adia
|Zainab Balogun
Stan Nze

Elozonam Ogbolu

Folu Storms

Eso Dike
|Comedy drama
|By Inkblot productions
|
|-
|rowspan="1" style="text-align:center; background:#d8d8d8; textcolor:#000;"|29
|Progressive Tailors Club
|Biodun Stephen
|Femi Adebayo Salami
Jaiye Kuti

Rachel Oniga

Uzor Arukwe
|Political satire
|By Anthill Studios
|
|-
| rowspan="2" style="text-align:center; background:green; textcolor:#000;" |NOVEMBER
| 
|Cordelia
|Tunde Kelani
|
|
|Based on a novel of the same name by Femi Osofisan
|
|-
|rowspan="1" style="text-align:center; background:#d8d8d8; textcolor:#000;"|26
|Soólè
|Kayode Kasum
|Sola Sobowale
Adedimeji Lateef

Femi Jacob

Adunni Ade

Shawn Faqua
|Comedy drama
|Production debut for Adunni Ade
|
|-
| rowspan="4" style="text-align:center; background:orange; textcolor:#000;" |DECEMBER
|rowspan="1" style="text-align:center; background:#d8d8d8; textcolor:#000;"|16
| rowspan="1" |A Naija Christmas
|Kunle Afolayan
|Rachel Oniga
Abayomi Alvin

Efa Iwara

Kunle Remi 
|Romantic Comedy
|First Nigerian Christmas film on Netflix
|
|-
|rowspan="1" style="text-align:center; background:#d8d8d8; textcolor:#000;"|17
|Aki and Pawpaw
|
|Chinedu IkediezeOsita IhemeAmaechi MuonagorToyin AbrahamChioma Okafor
|
|Remake of the 2002 film, Aki Na Ukwa
|
|-
| rowspan="1" style="text-align:center; background:#d8d8d8; textcolor:#000;"|24
|Christmas in Miami
|Robert Peters
|AY Makun Richard Mofe-Damijo  Osita Iheme  John Amos.
|Comedy
|Fourth film in AY Makun's Akpos series after 30 Days in Atlanta, A Trip to Jamaica and 10 Days in Suncity
|
|-
|rowspan="1" style="text-align:center; background:#d8d8d8; textcolor:#000;"|29
|Superstar
|Akhigbe Illozhobie
|Nancy Isime
Deyemi Okanlawon

Timini Egbuson

Daniel Etim Effiong

Eku Edewor
|Romantic comedy
|By Inkblot productions
|
|}

Unknown release dates 

 Window Bird

See also 

 2021 in Nigeria
 List of Nigerian films

References

External links 

2021
Lists of 2021 films by country or language
Films
2020s in Nigerian cinema